"Do You Want to Build a Snowman?" is a song from the 2013 Disney 3D computer-animated musical feature film Frozen, with music and lyrics composed by Kristen Anderson-Lopez and Robert Lopez. , the total sales of the digital track stands at 1,600,000 downloads according to Nielsen SoundScan, placing it second on the list of all-time best-selling Christmas/holiday digital singles in SoundScan history (behind Mariah Carey's 1994 hit single, "All I Want for Christmas Is You").

Synopsis
After Elsa accidentally harms Anna with her ice powers, she locks herself in her bedroom. The song captures three different moments at which Anna tries and fails to persuade Elsa to spend time with her: as children, teenagers, and adults. Within the film, the last of these moments occurs after the sisters' parents have died at sea in a storm.

Production
At one point Disney considered removing the song from the film because, as originally composed, it was too sad, and it was also too complicated in that it contained too much exposition. However it was put back after being well received by the Disney staff. StitchKingdom explains, "due to pacing of the film, this song was constantly being cut and put back in during the film’s development. Ultimately, studio employees demanded it stay in."  During the film's development, Lopez at one point had to travel to Los Angeles to work in person with the production team to try to fix the song, and they had to sit down and work through how Elsa sounds versus how Anna sounds.  Christophe Beck, who wrote the film's score, added the interlude for the montage scenes.

After the film was released, a fan put together a version of the song to show how a reprise could have worked at the climax of the film, when Elsa realizes that Anna is completely frozen. Commenting on the fan clip in January 2014, Anderson-Lopez mentioned that at one point, she actually had pitched a reprise of the song for the film's climax. Lopez added, "if you watch it in the flow of the movie, it would be jarring to have them break into song at that moment."

When the same clip was mentioned in an interview, director Jennifer Lee explained that according to Disney music producer Chris Montan (who has worked on nearly every Disney and Pixar animated film from the start of the Disney Renaissance), it is traditional in Disney animated musicals to have no more songs after the end of the second act.

Critical reception

The song received widespread acclaim from film critics, music critics, and audiences. Kyle Smith of The New York Post dubbed it a "classic". USA Today called it "a lovely musical number that illustrates Anna's emotional yearning, sung with heartfelt sweetness by Bell." Alonso Duralde of The Wrap labeled it "poignant". Moviefone describes the song as "sob-inducing", and "the best song in Frozen". Scott Mendelson of Forbes talks about the "richness and a subtle sadness to the core relationship between Anna and Elsa, of so much time lost to fear, self-doubt, and some questionable parenting at a key juncture", and goes on to describe "Do You Want To Build A Snowman" as a "beautiful song...it's just one of a handful of terrific songs". Mendelson added, "I was deathly afraid [it] would come back as a climactic refrain should the story end badly."

Sputnikmusic said "the songs complement the gorgeous visuals well, especially in the first extended cut "Do You Want to Build a Snowman" and its tear-pleading climax and conclusion", and argues "it’s one of the few vocal tracks far removed from the crushing vapidity of the other material". The Rochester City Newspaper described the song as "character-establishing", and noted that along with "Frozen Heart", it "deeply resemble[s] Disney's song output under Alan Menken...and that helps them feel instantly familiar". The soundtrack review adds, "While "Snowman" works better in the film (the visuals fill in some of the song's gaps) the twee-cute vocals and gorgeous melody help its memorability". AllMusic said this song and the love duet "Love Is an Open Door" have "contemporary Broadway dazzle".

The song is featured several times in Deadpool 2 where a running joke is made out of the title character Deadpool noticing, the "obvious" similarities between it and the song "Papa, Can You Hear Me?" from the film Yentl. As he is dying towards the end of the film, Deadpool sings the song's chorus to his teammates.

Charts and certifications

Charts

Certifications

Year-end chart

Cover Performances
Kristen Bell sang the song live as her character throughout every stage of her life at the Vibrato Grill Jazz Club in Los Angeles to celebrate the film.

Twenty-six members of the Disney Channel Circle of Stars performed a cover video of the song in July 2014.

Austin & Ally star Laura Marano performed a Hawaiian version of the song at Disney's Aulani Resort & Spa for Disney Parks' Frozen Christmas Celebration on ABC with Kamehameha Schools Children's Chorus singing the children's chorus.

Then-SM Entertainment trainees Koeun, Hina, Herin, and Lami covered the song in the Disney Channel Korea show Mickey Mouse Club on July 24, 2015.

Country singer Mickey Guyton recorded the song and released it on November 6, 2015, to digital retailers and music streaming services. Her version charted at number 57 on the Billboard Country Airplay chart.

Lea Michele covered the song for her 2019 Christmas album Christmas in the City.

See also
Papa, Can You Hear Me?

References

2013 songs
2010s ballads
Songs from Frozen (franchise)
Kingdom Hearts songs
Kristen Bell songs
Mickey Guyton songs
Songs about loneliness
Songs about weather

Songs written by Robert Lopez
Songs written by Kristen Anderson-Lopez